Seldon may refer to:

Places
Fort Seldon, a US Cavalry fort in New Mexico

People
Robert Seldon Lady (born 1954), noted member of the U.S. intelligence community
Anthony Seldon (born 1953), political commentator
Arthur Seldon (1916–2005), joint founder president of the Institute of Economic Affairs
Bruce Seldon (born 1967), American boxer
Myma Seldon (born 1979), British television - and radio presenter and voiceover artist
Seldon Connor (1839–1917), thirty-fifth governor of the U.S. state of Maine
Seldon Powell (1928–1997), American soul jazz, swing and R&B tenor saxophonist and flautist

Companies 

 Seldon (company), a British technology company

Characters
Hari Seldon, the intellectual hero of Isaac Asimov's Foundation Series
Raych Seldon, the adopted son of Hari Seldon and Dors Venabili
Wanda Seldon, the daughter of Raych Seldon and Manella Dubanqua

Fictional Concepts
Seldon Plan, the central theme of Isaac Asimov's Foundation Series
Seldon Crisis, a fictional socio-historical phenomenon in Isaac Asimov's Foundation Series

See also
Selden (disambiguation)